Artur Silveira da Mota, Baron of Jaceguai (26 May 1843 — 6 June 1914) was a Brazilian admiral, noble and writer. Mota fought in the Paraguayan War. He was an immortal of the Brazilian Academy of Letters.

Biography

Early life
The son of José Inácio Siqueira da Mota, Mota was born in São Paulo on 26 May 1843. At the age of fourteen he moved to Rio de Janeiro with his father who had just been appointed senator for the Goiás province. In Rio de Janeiro he joined the Colégio Vitória to later join the Naval School, which he did on 4 March 1858, as an aspirant of guarda-marinha, completing the course in 1860.

After the notorious wreck of the Brazilian corvette Isabel near the cape Spartel in 1860 that killed most of its crew, his father tried to persuade him into joining the army and even managed to get into contact with the Minister of War in order to facilitate the process, but Mota refused, continuing his career in the navy.

In 1851 he went on his first training trip aboard the corvette Baiana under the command of captain José Maria Rodrigues. On that occasion, he visited England, France, Spain, the coast of Africa and the United States. On 2 December 1852, he was promoted to 2nd lieutenant, being appointed hydrography instructor of the class of guarda-marinhas, who were on their long-haul instruction trip aboard the frigate Constituição. Mota was promoted to 1st Lieutenant when he returned to Brazil from that trip on 28 December 1863.

Paraguayan War

On 20 February 1865 Mota headed south to join the Río de la Plata fleet to begin naval operations in the ongoing Paraguayan War. There, on the 27th, the Viscount of Tamandaré, commander-in-chief of the Brazilian naval forces in the Río de la Plata, appointed him as his personal secretary and aide-de-camp.

About this appointment, senator Francisco Otaviano would later say in a speech in the Senate's tribune:

On 13 July 1867 he assumed command of the gunboat Ivaí. The Marquis of Caxias sent him to Rio de Janeiro on a private and special mission to the Emperor. Mota did his job with discretion and finesse and, on his return to the theater of war, was appointed commander of the ironclad Barroso. He took a prominent part in the battle of Curupayty. The trust Caxias and Inhaúma had for him put him on some of the most risky and difficult missions. In one of them, in Humaitá, Mota accomplished the greatest feat of his life forcing the very dangerous passage of the river, under the relentless fire of Paraguayan batteries.

Later years
When the Paraguayan War ended in 1870 Mota was 26 years old and was already captain at sea. He was appointed commander of the armoured corvette Nichteroy, then the largest ship in the Brazilian fleet, and set out on a long-distance instruction trip, commanding guarda-marinhas and officers, along the northern coast of Brazil.

A student of naval issues, Mota was concerned with the system to be adopted in the Brazilian navy. He was a supporter of the Armstrong system, which opposed the Whitworth, and at public conferences, some of which were attended by the emperor Pedro II, he defended his point of view. After experimenting on the subject, according to Mota's indications, the Brazilian Navy adopted the Armstrong system.

In 1873, after leaving the command of the corvette Nichteroy, Mota was sent to command a permanent scientific commission, with the purpose not only of completing a general survey of the coast of Brazil and of the Platine republics, but also of providing theoretical and practical exercises to officers who were still inexperienced. Later he was appointed naval attaché to the Brazilian legations in all European courts, receiving the particular task of studying the naval organization of these countries. In December 1878, he was promoted to the post of head-of-division and, in the following year, he was appointed Extraordinary Envoy and Plenipotentiary Minister on a special mission in China. He went aboard the corvette Vital de Oliveira. Upon his return, he was chosen to remodel the Rio de Janeiro navy shipyard. In 1882 he was promoted to chief-of-squadron of the Esquadra de Evoluções, a post that corresponds to today's rear admiral, and received the title of Baron de Jaceguai.

In 1887 he asked for retirement, an act that provoked vehement appeals from his comrades and friends. Away from active service, he did not completely abandon the profession he loved so much. In 1897, he was appointed director of the Navy Library, Museum and Archive, and editor of the Revista Marítima Brasileira magazine. In 1900 he was appointed director of the Naval School, where he carried out a major program of administration.

Mota applied for the Brazilian Academy of Letters in 1907, encouraged by Joaquim Nabuco, with the idea that the academy should represent, in its roster, the entirety of Brazilian intellectuals and not just aspects of national literary activity. In his inaugural speech, Mota did not praise his predecessor, Teixeira de Melo, claiming he "had not known the man or his work". Goulart de Andrade, who succeeded him at the academy, believed to have found another explanation for this silence: in the national Ephemerides, when reporting the passage of Humaitá in the Brazilian squadron, Teixeira de Melo mentioned the name of the commander of the division, Delfim Carlos de Carvalho, later Baron of Passagem, omitting that of the Barroso commander, Artur Silveira da Mota.

Mota finally retired on 15 February 1911. He died three years later, suffering with arteriosclerosis, on 6 June 1914.

References

Notes

Citations

Bibliography
 

1843 births
1914 deaths
Brazilian generals
Brazilian nobility
Brazilian Academy of Letters
Brazilian military personnel of the Paraguayan War